John Miltern (1870-1937) was an actor in theater and films in the United States. He was in the Broadway play Yellow Jack. He was also in Channing Pollock's play Roads of Destiny. Another of his stage performances was described as manly and always sympathetic.

In 1927, he was one of the actors arrested for performing in theater productions determined to be indecent by authorities.

Filmography
New York (1916) as Oliver King
Her Final Reckoning (1918) as Prince Zilah
Innocent (1918) as John Wyndham
The Profiteers (1919)
On with the Dance (1920) 
Experience (1921) as Experience
The Kentuckians (1921) as Colton
The Hands of Nara (1922)
Kick In (1922)
Love's Boomerang (1922)
Manslaughter (1922)
The Man Who Saw Tomorrow (1922)
Three Live Ghosts (1922) 
The Ne'er-Do-Well (1923) as Stephen Courtlandt
Tongues of Flame (1924) as Scanlon
Coming Through (1925) as John Rand
Fine Manners (1926)
East Side, West Side (1927)
The Love of Sunya (1927)
Social Register (1934) as Mr. Henry Breene
Ring Around the Moon (1936) as Mr. Endicott
Parole! (1936) as Governor Slade
Sins of Man (1936) as Mr. Hall
Murder on a Bridle Path (1936)
Everybody's Old Man (1936)

References

External links

American actors